Colin McKay (born 1896) was a Scottish professional footballer who played in England for Sheffield Wednesday, Huddersfield Town and Bradford City. He was born in Kilmarnock, Scotland.

References

1896 births
Year of death missing
Scottish footballers
Footballers from Kilmarnock
Association football midfielders
English Football League players
Sheffield Wednesday F.C. players
Huddersfield Town A.F.C. players
Bradford City A.F.C. players